Mohammad Idris Abdul Shomad (born 25 July 1961) is the mayor of Depok. Active in various Islamic organizations in Indonesia, he was first elected in the 2015 local elections and was officially made mayor in 2016. Prior to becoming mayor, he served as deputy between 2011 and 2016.

Personal life
As a child, he studied in a Muhammadiyah-run primary school, before continuing to a madrasa and later to a pesantren in Ponorogo, East Java. After receiving a scholarship in 1982, he went to Saudi Arabia and obtained his Bachelor's, Master's, and Doctorate degree after 15 years of Shari'a studies in Imam Muhammad ibn Saud Islamic University, Riyadh.

Career
After returning to Indonesia, he became a lecturer in Syarif Hidayatullah State Islamic University Jakarta, teaching communication science, da'wah and civilization history. He also acted as a sharia consultant and taught Islam-related subjects in several other universities, including being a lecturer on islamic economics in the University of Indonesia between 2002 and 2006.

He also acted as the secretary-general of IKADI (Indonesian Islamic proselytizing organization) between 2005 and 2015, and the chief of the Depok chapter of the Indonesian Ulema Council.

City administration
In the 2010 local elections, he ran as a deputy mayoral candidate with Nur Mahmudi Ismail, who had been mayor of Depok in the 2006-2011 term as the first directly-elected regional leader in Indonesia. The couple won the election, and during their five-year tenure the city's government received several awards from the central government on sanitation, health and child-friendliness.

In the 2015 elections, with Ismail being constitutionally prohibited from getting a third term, Idris ran with Great Indonesia Movement Party politician Pradi Supriatna. The pair secured 411,367 votes (59.4%) and defeated a PDIP-supported pair.

Upon his appointment as mayor in 2016, his first officially issued order was to cease issuing permits for new convenience stores (minimarket).

After the conviction of Indonesian national and serial rapist Reynhard Sinaga in the United Kingdom, Idris announced that he plans to raid the local LGBT community in Depok. This announcement was swiftly condemned by human rights activists.

References

1961 births
Living people
Indonesian Muslims
Mayors and regents of places in West Java
People from Depok
Politicians from Jakarta
Mayors of places in Indonesia